Whole number is a colloquial term in mathematics. The meaning is ambiguous. It may refer to either:

Natural number, an element of the set  or of the set 
Integer, an element of the set